A 501(c)(3) organization is a United States corporation, trust, unincorporated association or other type of organization exempt from federal income tax under section 501(c)(3) of Title 26 of the United States Code. It is one of the 29 types of 501(c) nonprofit organizations in the US.

501(c)(3) tax-exemptions apply to entities that are organized and operated exclusively for religious, charitable, scientific, literary or educational purposes, for testing for public safety, to foster national or international amateur sports competition, or for the prevention of cruelty to children or animals. 501(c)(3) exemption applies also for any non-incorporated community chest, fund, cooperating association or foundation organized and operated exclusively for those purposes. There are also supporting organizations—often referred to in shorthand form as "Friends of" organizations.

 provides a deduction for federal income tax purposes, for some donors who make charitable contributions to most types of 501(c)(3) organizations, among others. Regulations specify which such deductions must be verifiable to be allowed (e.g., receipts for donations of $250 or more).

Due to the tax deductions associated with donations, loss of 501(c)(3) status can be highly challenging if not fatal to a charity's continued operation, as many foundations and corporate matching funds do not grant funds to a charity without such status, and individual donors often do not donate to such a charity due to the unavailability of tax deduction for contributions.

Types 
The two exempt classifications of 501(c)(3) organizations are as follows:
 A public charity, identified by the Internal Revenue Service (IRS) as "not a private foundation", normally receives a substantial part of its income, directly or indirectly, from the general public or from the government. The public support must be fairly broad, not limited to a few individuals or families. Public charities are defined in the Internal Revenue Code under sections 509(a)(0) through 509(a)(4).
 A private foundation, sometimes called a non-operating foundation, receives most of its income from investments and endowments. This income is used to make grants to other organizations, rather than being disbursed directly for charitable activities. Private foundations are defined in the Internal Revenue Code under section 509(a) as 501(c)(3) organizations, which do not qualify as public charities.

Obtaining status 
The basic requirement of obtaining tax-exempt status is that the organization is specifically limited in powers to purposes that the IRS classifies as tax-exempt purposes. Unlike for-profit corporations that benefit from broad and general purposes, non-profit organizations need to be limited in powers to function with tax-exempt status, but a non-profit corporation is by default not limited in powers until it specifically limits itself in the articles of incorporation or nonprofit corporate bylaws. This limiting of the powers is crucial to obtaining tax exempt status with the IRS and then on the state level. Organizations acquire 501(c)(3) tax exemption by filing IRS Form 1023. , the form must be accompanied by an $850 filing fee if the yearly gross receipts for the organization are expected to average $10,000 or more. If yearly gross receipts are expected to average less than $10,000, the filing fee is reduced to $400. There are some classes of organizations that automatically are treated as tax exempt under 501(c)(3), without the need to file Form 1023:
 Churches, their integrated auxiliaries, and conventions or associations of churches. A convention or association of churches generally refers to the organizational structure of congregational churches. A convention or association of churches can also refer to a cooperative undertaking of churches of various denominations that works together to perform religious activities.
 Organizations that are not private foundations and that have gross receipts that normally are not more than $5,000

The IRS released a software tool called Cyber Assistant in 2013, which was succeeded by Form 1023-EZ in 2014.

There is an alternative way for an organization to obtain status if an organization has applied for a determination and either there is an actual controversy regarding a determination or the Internal Revenue Service has failed to make a determination. In these cases, the United States Tax Court, the United States District Court for the District of Columbia, and the United States Court of Federal Claims have concurrent jurisdiction to issue a declaratory judgment of the organization's qualification if the organization has exhausted administrative remedies with the Internal Revenue Service.

Prior to October 9, 1969, nonprofit organizations could declare themselves to be tax-exempt under Section 501(c)(3) without first obtaining Internal Revenue Service recognition by filing Form 1023 and receiving a determination letter. A nonprofit organization that did so prior to that date could still be subject to challenge of its status by the Internal Revenue Service.

Tax-deductible charitable contributions
Individuals may take a tax deduction on a charitable gift to a 501(c)(3) organization that is organized and operated exclusively for religious, charitable, scientific, literary or educational purposes, or to foster national or international amateur sports competition (but only if no part of its activities involve the provision of athletic facilities or equipment), or for the prevention of cruelty to children or animals.

An individual may not take a tax deduction on gifts made to a 501(c)(3) organization that is organized and operated exclusively for the testing for public safety.

In the case of tuition fees paid to a private 501(c)(3) school or a church school, the payments are not tax-deductible charitable contributions because they are payments for services rendered to the payee or the payee's children. The payments are not tax-deductible charitable contributions even if a significant portion of a church school's curriculum is religious education. For a payment to be a tax-deductible charitable contribution, it must be a voluntary transfer of money or other property with no expectation of procuring financial benefit equal to the transfer amount.

Before donating to a 501(c)(3) organization, a donor can consult the searchable online IRS list of charitable organizations to verify that the organization qualifies to receive tax-deductible charitable contributions.

Consumers may file IRS Form 13909, with documentation, to complain about inappropriate or fraudulent (i.e., fundraising, political campaigning, lobbying) activities by any 501(c)(3) organization.

Most 501(c)(3) must disclose the names and addresses of certain large donors to the Internal Revenue Service on their annual returns, but this information is not required to be made available to the public,
unless the organization is an independent foundation. 
Churches are generally exempt from this reporting requirement.

Transparency
All 501(c)(3) organizations must make available for public inspection its application for tax-exemption, including its Form 1023 or Form 1023-EZ and any attachments, supporting documents, and follow-up correspondence with the Internal Revenue Service. The same public inspection requirement applies to the organization's annual return, namely its Form 990, Form 990-EZ, Form 990-PF, Form 990-T, and Form 1065, including any attachments, supporting documents, and follow-up correspondence with the Internal Revenue Service, with the exception of the names and addresses of donors on Schedule B. Annual returns must be made publicly available for a three-year period beginning with the due date of the return, including any extension of time for filing.

The Internal Revenue Service provides information about specific 501(c)(3) organizations through its Tax Exempt Organization Search online.

A private nonprofit organization, GuideStar, provides information on 501(c)(3) organizations.

ProPublica's Nonprofit Explorer provides copies of each organization's Form 990 and, for some organizations, audited financial statements.

Open990 is a searchable database of information about organizations over time.

WikiCharities, a nonprofit organization, is a growing global database that allows nonprofits and charities to be searchable by name, location, and topic.  WikiCharities also gives each nonprofit a personalized webpage where nonprofits can improve transparency by listing updated contact information, leadership, board members, financials, annual reports, project activities, and more.

Limitations on political activity

Section 501(c)(3) organizations are prohibited from supporting political candidates, as a result of the Johnson Amendment enacted in 1954. Section 501(c)(3) organizations are subject to limits on lobbying, having a choice between two sets of rules establishing an upper bound for their lobbying activities. Section 501(c)(3) organizations risk loss of their tax-exempt status if these rules are violated. An organization that loses its 501(c)(3) status due to being engaged in political activities cannot subsequently qualify for 501(c)(3) status.

Churches 
Churches must meet specific requirements to obtain and maintain tax-exempt status; these are outlined in "IRS Publication 1828: Tax Guide for Churches and Religious Organizations". This guide outlines activities allowed and not allowed by churches under the 501(c)(3) designation.

In 1980, the United States District Court for the District of Columbia recognized a 14-part test in determining whether a religious organization is considered a church for the purposes of the Internal Revenue Code:

Having an established congregation served by an organized ministry is of central importance. Points 4, 6, 8, 11, 12, and 13 are also especially important. Nevertheless, the 14-point list is a guideline; it is not intended to be all-encompassing, and other relevant facts and circumstances may be factors. 

Although there is no definitive definition of a church for Internal Revenue Code purposes, in 1986 the United States Tax Court said that "A church is a coherent group of individuals and families that join together to accomplish the religious purposes of mutually held beliefs. In other words, a church's principal means of accomplishing its religious purposes must be to assemble regularly a group of individuals related by common worship and faith." The United States Tax Court has stated that, while a church can certainly broadcast its religious services by radio, radio broadcasts themselves do not constitute a congregation unless there is a group of people physically attending those religious services. A church can conduct worship services in various specific locations rather than in one official location. A church may have a significant number of people associate themselves with the church on a regular basis, even if the church does not have a traditional established list of individual members.

In order to qualify as a tax-exempt church, church activities must be a significant part of the organization's operations.

An organization whose operations include a substantial nonexempt commercial purposes, such as operating restaurants and grocery stores in a manner consistent with a particular religion's religious beliefs does not qualify as a tax-exempt church.

Political campaign activities
Organizations described in section 501(c)(3) are prohibited from conducting political campaign activities to intervene in elections to public office. The Internal Revenue Service website elaborates on this prohibition:

Constitutionality
Since section 501(c)(3)'s political-activity prohibition was enacted, "commentators and litigants have challenged the provision on numerous constitutional grounds," such as freedom of speech, vagueness, and equal protection and selective prosecution. Historically, Supreme Court decisions, such as Regan v. Taxation with Representation of Washington, suggested that the Court, if it were to squarely examine the political-activity prohibition of § 501(c)(3), would uphold it against a constitutional challenge. However, some have suggested that a successful challenge to the political activities prohibition of Section 501(c)(3) might be more plausible in light of Citizens United v. FEC.

Lobbying

In contrast to the prohibition on political campaign interventions by all section 501(c)(3) organizations, public charities (but not private foundations) may conduct a limited amount of lobbying to influence legislation. Although the law states that "no substantial part" of a public charity's activities can go to lobbying, charities with large budgets may lawfully expend a million dollars (under the "expenditure" test) or more (under the "substantial part" test) per year on lobbying.

The Internal Revenue Service has never defined the term "substantial part" with respect to lobbying.

To establish a safe harbor for the "substantial part" test, the United States Congress enacted §501(h), called the Conable election after its author, Representative Barber Conable. The section establishes limits based on operating budget that a charity can use to determine if it meets the substantial test. This changes the prohibition against direct intervention in partisan contests only for lobbying. The organization is now presumed in compliance with the substantiality test if they work within the limits. The Conable election requires a charity to file a declaration with the IRS and file a functional distribution of funds spreadsheet with their Form 990. IRS form 5768 is required to make the Conable election.

Foreign activities
A 501(c)(3) organization is allowed to conduct some or all of its charitable activities outside the United States. A 501(c)(3) organization is allowed to award grants to foreign charitable organizations if the grants are intended for charitable purposes and the grant funds are subject to the 501(c)(3) organization's control. Additional procedures are required of 501(c)(3) organizations that are private foundations.

Allowance of tax-deduction by donors
Donors' contributions to a 501(c)(3) organization are tax-deductible only if the contribution is for the use of the 501(c)(3) organization, and that the 501(c)(3) organization is not merely serving as an agent or conduit of a foreign charitable organization. The 501(c)(3) organization's management should review the grant application from the foreign organization, decide whether to award the grant based on the intended use of the funds, and require continuous oversight based on the use of funds.

If the donor imposes a restriction or earmark that the contribution must be used for foreign activities, then the contribution is deemed to be for the foreign organization rather than the 501(c)(3) organization, and the contribution is not tax-deductible.

The purpose of the grant to the foreign organization cannot include endorsing or opposing political candidates for elected office in any country.

Foreign subsidiaries
If a 501(c)(3) organization sets up and controls a foreign subsidiary to facilitate charitable work in a foreign country, then donors' contributions to the 501(c)(3) organization are tax-deductible even if intended to fund the foreign charitable activities.

If a foreign organization sets up a 501(c)(3) organization for the sole purpose of raising funds for the foreign organization, and the 501(c)(3) organization sends substantially all contributions to the foreign organization, then donors' contributions to the 501(c)(3) organization are not tax-deductible to the donors.

References

External links 
 Tax Exempt Organization Search. Internal Revenue Service.

 
0501c
Non-profit organizations based in the United States
Taxation in the United States
Charity law